The Fertile Crescent is a crescent-shaped region in the Middle East, spanning modern-day Iraq, Syria, Lebanon,   Israel, Palestine and Jordan, together with the northern region of Kuwait, southeastern region of Turkey and the western portion of Iran. Some authors also include Cyprus and Northern Egypt.

The Fertile Crescent is believed to be the very first region where settled farming emerged as people started the process of clearance and modification of natural vegetation to grow newly domesticated plants as crops. Early human civilizations such as Sumer in Mesopotamia flourished as a result. Technological advances in the region include the development of agriculture and the use of irrigation, of writing, the wheel, and glass, most emerging first in Mesopotamia.

Terminology

The term "Fertile Crescent" was popularized by archaeologist James Henry Breasted in Outlines of European History (1914) and Ancient Times, A History of the Early World (1916). He wrote:

There no single term for this region in antiquity. At the time that Breasted was writing, it roughly corresponded with the territories of the Ottoman Empire ceded to Britain and France in the Sykes–Picot Agreement. Historian Thomas Scheffler has noted that Breasted was following a trend in Western geography to "overwrite the classical geographical distinctions between continents, countries and landscapes with large, abstract spaces", drawing parallels with the work of Halford Mackinder, who conceptualised Eurasia as a 'pivot area' surrounded by an 'inner crescent', Alfred Thayer Mahan's Middle East, and Friedrich Naumann's Mitteleuropa.

In current usage, the Fertile Crescent includes Israel, Palestine, Iraq, Syria, Lebanon, Egypt, and Jordan, as well as the surrounding portions of Turkey and Iran. In addition to the Tigris and Euphrates, riverwater sources include the Jordan River. The inner boundary is delimited by the dry climate of the Syrian Desert to the south. Around the outer boundary are the Anatolian and Armenian highlands to the north, the Sahara Desert to the west, Sudan to the south, and the Iranian plateau to the east.

Biodiversity and climate
As crucial as rivers and marshlands were to the rise of civilization in the Fertile Crescent, they were not the only factor. The area is geographically important as the "bridge" between North Africa and Eurasia, which has allowed it to retain a greater amount of biodiversity than either Europe or North Africa, where climate changes during the Ice Age led to repeated extinction events when ecosystems became squeezed against the waters of the Mediterranean Sea. The Saharan pump theory posits that this Middle Eastern land bridge was extremely important to the modern distribution of Old World flora and fauna, including the spread of humanity.

The area has borne the brunt of the tectonic divergence between the African and Arabian plates and the converging Arabian and Eurasian plates, which has made the region a very diverse zone of high snow-covered mountains.

The Fertile Crescent had many diverse climates, and major climatic changes encouraged the evolution of many "r" type annual plants, which produce more edible seeds than "K" type perennial plants. The region's dramatic variety in elevation gave rise to many species of edible plants for early experiments in cultivation. Most importantly, the Fertile Crescent was home to the eight Neolithic founder crops important in early agriculture (i.e., wild progenitors to emmer wheat, einkorn, barley, flax, chick pea, pea, lentil, bitter vetch), and four of the five most important species of domesticated animals—cows, goats, sheep, and pigs; the fifth species, the horse, lived nearby. The Fertile Crescent flora comprises a high percentage of plants that can self-pollinate, but may also be cross-pollinated. These plants, called "selfers", were one of the geographical advantages of the area because they did not depend on other plants for reproduction.

History

As well as possessing many sites with the skeletal and cultural remains of both pre-modern and early modern humans (e.g., at Tabun and Es Skhul caves in Israel), later Pleistocene hunter-gatherers, and Epipalaeolithic semi-sedentary hunter-gatherers (the Natufians); the Fertile Crescent is most famous for its sites related to the origins of agriculture. The western zone around the Jordan and upper Euphrates rivers gave rise to the first known Neolithic farming settlements (referred to as Pre-Pottery Neolithic A (PPNA)), which date to around 9,000 BCE and includes very ancient sites such as Göbekli Tepe, Chogha Golan, and Jericho (Tell es-Sultan).

This region, alongside Mesopotamia (Greek for "between rivers", between the rivers Tigris and Euphrates, which lies in the east of the Fertile Crescent), also saw the emergence of early complex societies during the succeeding Bronze Age. There is also early evidence from the region for writing and the formation of hierarchical state level societies. This has earned the region the nickname "The cradle of civilization".

It is in this region where the first libraries appeared about 4,500 years ago. The oldest known libraries are found in Nippur (in Sumer) and Ebla (in Syria), both from c. 2500 BCE.

Both the Tigris and Euphrates start in the Taurus Mountains of what is modern-day Turkey. Farmers in southern Mesopotamia had to protect their fields from flooding each year.  Northern Mesopotamia had sufficient rain to make some farming possible. To protect against flooding they made levees.

Since the Bronze Age, the region's natural fertility has been greatly extended by irrigation works, upon which much of its agricultural production continues to depend. The last two millennia have seen repeated cycles of decline and recovery as past works have fallen into disrepair through the replacement of states, to be replaced under their successors. Another ongoing problem has been salination—gradual concentration of salt and other minerals in soils with a long history of irrigation.

Early domestications
Prehistoric seedless figs were discovered at Gilgal I in the Jordan Valley, suggesting that fig trees were being planted some 11,400 years ago. Cereals were already grown in Syria as long as 9,000 years ago. Small cats (Felis silvestris) also were domesticated in this region. Also, legumes including peas, lentils and chickpea were domesticated in this region.

Domesticated animals include the cattle, sheep, goat, domestic pig, cat, and domestic goose.

Cosmopolitan diffusion

Modern analyses comparing 24 craniofacial measurements reveal a relatively diverse population within the pre-Neolithic, Neolithic and Bronze Age Fertile Crescent, supporting the view that several populations occupied this region during these time periods. Similar arguments do not hold true for the Basques and Canary Islanders of the same time period, as the studies demonstrate those ancient peoples to be "clearly associated with modern Europeans". Additionally, no evidence from the studies demonstrates Cro-Magnon influence, contrary to former suggestions.

The studies further suggest a diffusion of this diverse population away from the Fertile Crescent, with the early migrants moving away from the Near East—westward into Europe and North Africa, northward to Crimea, and northeastward to Mongolia. They took their agricultural practices with them and interbred with the hunter-gatherers whom they subsequently came in contact with while perpetuating their farming practices. This supports prior genetic and archaeological studies which have all arrived at the same conclusion.

Consequently, contemporary in situ peoples absorbed the agricultural way of life of those early migrants who ventured out of the Fertile Crescent. This is contrary to the suggestion that the spread of agriculture disseminated out of the Fertile Crescent by way of sharing of knowledge. Instead, the view now supported by a preponderance of evidence is that it occurred by actual migration out of the region, coupled with subsequent interbreeding with indigenous local populations whom the migrants came in contact with.

The studies show also that not all present day Europeans share strong genetic affinities to the Neolithic and Bronze Age inhabitants of the Fertile Crescent; the closest ties to the Fertile Crescent rest with Southern Europeans. The same study further demonstrates all present-day Europeans to be closely related.

Languages

Linguistically, the Fertile Crescent was a region of great diversity. Historically, Semitic languages generally prevailed in the modern regions of Iraq, Syria, Jordan, Lebanon, Israel, Palestine, Sinai and  the fringes of southeast Turkey and northwest Iran, as well as the Sumerian (a language isolate) in Iraq, whilst in the mountainous areas to the east and north a number of generally unrelated language isolates were found, including; Elamite, Gutian and Kassite in Iran, and Hattic, Kaskian and Hurro-Urartian in Turkey. The precise affiliation of these, and their date of arrival, remain topics of scholarly discussion. However, given lack of textual evidence for the earliest era of prehistory, this debate is unlikely to be resolved in the near future.

The evidence that does exist suggests that, by the third millennium BCE and into the second, several language groups already existed in the region. These included:
 Proto-Euphratean language: a non-Semitic language previously hypothesized to be the substratum language of the people that introduced farming into Southern Iraq in the Early Ubaid period. (5300–4700 BCE) The linguistic consensus today is that multiple unknown substrata contributed to the formation of the artifacts in Sumerian names that motivated the Proto-Euphratean substrate hypothesis, including fossilized archaic elements from earlier stages of Sumerian itself. Another theory proposes that the pre-writing substrate was an early Indo-European language tentatively called Euphratic.
 Sumerian: a non-Semitic language isolate that displays a Sprachbund-type relationship with neighbouring Semitic Akkadian
 Elamite language: a non-Semitic language isolate
 Semitic languages: Akkadian (aka Assyrian and Babylonian), Eblaite, Amorite, Aramaic, Ugaritic, Canaanite languages (including Hebrew, Moabite, Edomite, Phoenician/Carthaginian)
 Hattic: a language isolate, spoken originally in central Anatolia
 Indo-European languages: generally believed to be later intrusive languages arriving after 2000 BCE, such as Hittite, Luwian and the Indo-Aryan material attested in the Mitanni civilization
 Egyptian: a stand-alone branch of the Afroasiatic languages confined to Egypt
 Hurro-Urartian languages, a small family. The Kassite language spoken in the northern part of the region may have belonged to this family.

Links between Hurro-Urartian and Hattic and the indigenous languages of the Caucasus have frequently been suggested, but are not generally accepted.

See also
 Beth Nahrain
 Hilly Flanks
 History of agriculture
 History of Mesopotamia
 Hydraulic empire
 Levantine corridor
 Fertile Crescent Plan

References

Bibliography

Jared Diamond, Guns, Germs and Steel: A Short History of Everybody for the Last 13,000 Years, 1997.
Anderson, Clifford Norman. The Fertile Crescent: Travels In the Footsteps of Ancient Science. 2d ed., rev. Fort Lauderdale: Sylvester Press, 1972.
Deckers, Katleen. Holocene Landscapes Through Time In the Fertile Crescent. Turnhout: Brepols, 2011.
Ephʻal, Israel. The Ancient Arabs: Nomads On the Borders of the Fertile Crescent 9th–5th Centuries B.C. Jerusalem: Magnes Press, 1982.
Kajzer, Małgorzata, Łukasz Miszk, and Maciej Wacławik. The Land of Fertility I: South-East Mediterranean Since the Bronze Age to the Muslim Conquest. Newcastle upon Tyne, UK: Cambridge Scholars Publishing, 2016.
Kozłowski, Stefan Karol. The Eastern Wing of the Fertile Crescent: Late Prehistory of Greater Mesopotamian Lithic Industries. Oxford: Archaeopress, 1999.
 

Thomas, Alexander R. The Evolution of the Ancient City: Urban Theory and the Archaeology of the Fertile Crescent. Lanham: Lexington Books/Rowman & Littlefield Publishers, 2010.

External links

 Ancient Fertile Crescent Almost Gone, Satellite Images Show– from National Geographic News, May 18, 2001. 
 http://www.claudiusptolemy.org/AbshireGusevStafeyev_ProceedingsVenice2017.pdf  Corey Abshire , Dmitri Gusev , Sergey Stafeyev  The Fertile Crescent  in Ptolemy’s “Geography”: a new digital reconstruction for modern GIS tools 

1910s neologisms
Ancient Near East
Eastern Mediterranean
History of the Mediterranean
Physiographic divisions
Historical regions
Divided regions
Cradle of civilization